Huiguo (746–805) was a Buddhist monk of Tang China who studied and taught Chinese Esoteric Buddhism, a Vajrayana tradition recently imported from India. Later Huiguo would become the teacher of Kūkai, founder of Shingon Buddhism, a prominent school of Buddhism in Japan.

Biography
Huiguo was one of two Buddhist masters at Ximing Temple, the other being the Indian monk Prajñā. Huiguo began his study of Buddhism as a śrāmaṇera at age 9 under a senior disciple of Amoghavajra, an Indo-Sogdian monk of the tantric tradition, eventually becoming a direct disciple. By age 22 in 766 CE, Huiguo was ordained as a monk and extensively studied the Womb Realm and Diamond Realm mandalas before being fully initiated into Vajrayana that same year by Amoghavajra.

Succession
In time, Huiguo's prominence attracted students from Korea, Central Asia and even Java, aside from his Chinese students. By 805, Huiguo was introduced to the Japanese monk Kūkai, who writes of the encounter (emphasis added):

Huiguo began an intensive training of Kūkai that ended when he died in 805 CE. After his death, the practices of the tantric tradition became absorbed to a large extent into the other Buddhist traditions in China. In Japan, the tradition was maintained as a separate sect, Shingon.
In 806, Kukai quoted his master Huiguo saying "Esoteric scriptures are so abstruse that their meaning can't be conveyed except through art."

References

 Buswell, Robert E., Lopez, Donald S. Jr. (2014). The Princeton Dictionary of Buddhism, Princeton: Princeton University Press, 364-365

746 births
805 deaths
8th-century Buddhist monks
9th-century Buddhist monks
Chinese Buddhist monks
Chinese Buddhists
Tang dynasty Buddhist monks
Shingon Buddhism